Play Girl is a 1932 American pre-Code romantic drama film starring Winnie Lightner, Loretta Young, and Norman Foster. The screenplay concerns a young woman who marries a professional gambler.

Plot

Cast
 Winnie Lightner as Georgine Hicks
 Loretta Young as Buster Green Dennis
 Norman Foster as Wallace "Wallie" Dennis
 Guy Kibbee as Finkelwald
 Dorothy Burgess as Edna
 Noel Madison as Martie Happ
 James Ellison as Elmer
 Edward Van Sloan as Moffatt
 George 'Gabby' Hayes as Dance Hall Tobacconist
 Adrienne Dore as The Reno Girl (uncredited)

Preservation status
It has been preserved in the Library of Congress collection since the 1970s.

References

External links
 
 
 
 

1932 films
1932 romantic drama films
American black-and-white films
American romantic drama films
Films directed by Ray Enright
Films about gambling
Warner Bros. films
1930s English-language films
1930s American films